Juliana Donald (born January 1, 1964) is an American film and television actress.

She was born in Washington, D.C. She played "Jenny" in the 1984 Jim Henson movie The Muppets Take Manhattan, her feature film debut. She later appeared in such films as The Purple Rose of Cairo,  Dragnet, and Brain Donors. She has appeared on television in Riptide, The Law and Harry McGraw, Star Trek: The Next Generation, Star Trek: Deep Space Nine, Melrose Place, NYPD Blue, Babylon 5, The X-Files and Close to Home, as well as doing voiceover work on animated films. Her most recent film was in the 2005 movie One More Round.

Filmography

Animation

Films

TV

Video Games

References

1964 births
Living people
American film actresses
American television actresses
American voice actresses
Actresses from Washington, D.C.
21st-century American women